Vladimir Vasilyevich Volkov (7 March 1921 – 1986) was a Russian athlete. He competed in the men's decathlon at the 1952 Summer Olympics, representing the Soviet Union. He was also the Soviet champion in the same event.

References

External links
 

1921 births
1986 deaths
Athletes (track and field) at the 1952 Summer Olympics
Russian decathletes
Olympic athletes of the Soviet Union
Athletes from Moscow
Soviet decathletes